Nawapara Road railway station is a railway station on the East Coast Railway network in the state of Odisha, India. It serves Nawapara town. Its code is NPD. It has two platforms. Passenger, Express trains halt at Nawapara Road railway station.

Major trains

 Durg–Jagdalpur Express
 Korba–Visakhapatnam Express
 Puri–Durg Express
 Bilaspur–Tirupati Express

See also
 Nuapada district

References

Railway stations in Nuapada district
Sambalpur railway division